Fans is the second album by Malcolm McLaren, released in 1984. It was an attempt at fusing opera with 1980s R&B and contains adaptations of pieces from famous operas such as Madama Butterfly and Carmen. The opera recordings were made at the Unitarian Church, Belmont, Massachusetts by Stephen Hague and Walter Turbitt.

Singles
Two singles were released from the album: "Madame Butterfly (un bel dì vedremo)" peaked at number 13 in the UK Singles Chart and "Carmen (L'Oiseau Rebelle)" reached number 79.

Track listing

More tracks
 "Madam Butterfly (On-The-Fly Mix)"
 "Madam Butterfly (Ocean Mix)"
 "Carmen (Instrumental Remix)"
 "Death of Butterfly (Instrumental)"

Personnel
 Timothy McFarland – conductor and operatic coordinator
 Malcolm McLaren – production
 Robbie Kilgore – production
 Mike Finleyson – engineering
 Tom Lord-Alge – engineering
 Jeff Neiblum – assistant engineering
 John Davenport – associate engineering
 Bradshaw Leigh – mixing
 Nick Egan – cover design
 Robert Erdman – photography
 Bob Green – "Butterfly Ball" photography

Charts

References

1984 albums
Albums produced by Stephen Hague
Covers albums
Charisma Records albums
Island Records albums
Malcolm McLaren albums